Optediceros is a genus of minute operculate snails, marine gastropod mollusks or micromollusks in the subfamily Ekadantinae of the family Assimineidae.

Species
Species within Optediceros include:
 Optediceros breviculum (Pfeiffer, 1855)
 Optediceros marginatum Leith, 1853
Species brought into synonymy
 Optediceros corneum Leith, 1853: synonym of Assiminea cornea (Leith, 1853) (original combination)

References

 Leith, A. H. 1853. Note on an Apparently New Genus of Gasteropod. The Journal of the Bombay Branch of the Royal Asiatic Society 5: 145-146.
 Habe, T. (1942). Classification of Japanese Assimineidae. Venus. 12(1-2): 32-56, pls 1-4.

External links
 Fukuda H. & Ponder W.F. 2003. Australian freshwater assimineids, with a synopsis of the Recent genus-group taxa of the Assimineidae (Mollusca: Caenogastropoda: Rissooidea). Journal of Natural History, 37: 1977-2032

Assimineidae